Handley's slender opossum (Marmosops handleyi) is a species of opossum in the family Didelphidae. It is endemic to Colombia.

References

Opossums
Endemic fauna of Colombia
Mammals of Colombia
EDGE species
Mammals described in 1981
Taxonomy articles created by Polbot